Allamaprabhu was a 12th-century mystic-saint and Vachana poet (called Vachanakara) of the Kannada language, propagating the unitary consciousness of Self and Shiva. Allamaprabhu is one of the celebrated poets and the patron saint of the Lingayata movement that reshaped medieval Karnataka society and popular Kannada literature. He is included among the "Trinity of Lingayathism", along with Basavanna, the founder of the movement, and Akka Mahadevi, the most prominent woman poet.

Allamaprabhu used poetry, now part of Vachana Sahitya literature, to criticise rituals and social conventions, to break down social barriers and to emphasize moral values and devotional worship of Shiva. It is well accepted that though Basavanna was the inspiration behind the Lingayath movement and earned the honorific "elder brother" (anna) at the "mansion of experience" (Anubhava Mantapa), Allama was the real guru who presided over it.

According to the scholars K. A. Nilakanta Sastri and Joseph T. Shipley, Vachana literature comprises pithy pieces of poetic prose in easy to understand, yet compelling Kannada language. The scholar E. P. Rice characterises Vachana poems as brief parallelistic allusive poems, each ending with one of the popular local names of the god Shiva and preaching the common folk detachment from worldly pleasures and adherence to devotion to the god Shiva (Shiva Bhakti).

Biography
The biographical details of Allamaprabhu that can be historically verified are scanty, and much that is known about him is from hagiographic legends. Some details of the early life of Allama are available in the writings of noted Hoysala poet Harihara, while other accounts are generally considered legendary. Allamaprabhu was born in Shimoga district of Karnataka, India, in the 12th century, to Sujnani and Nirashankara. He was a contemporary of the other famous Lingayat devotee-poets (sharanas), Basavanna and Akka Mahadevi. According to Harihara's biography of Allama, the earliest account of the saint's life, he was a temple drummer in modern Shivamogga district, Karnataka state, India. He came from a family of temple performers, was himself an expert at playing a type of drum called maddale, and his father was a dance teacher.

Allamaprabhu married a dancer named Kamalathe, but she died prematurely. The grief-stricken Allama wandered aimlessly, arriving at a cave temple, where he met the saint Animisayya (or Animisha, "the open eyed one"). The saint gave him a linga icon, blessed him with knowledge on god, and, Allama was enlightened and transformed into a seeker of spirituality. Allama's pen name,  (ankita or mudra), Guheshvara the god who stays with every one in the heart cave (also spelt Guheswara or  Guhesvara, lit, "Lord of the caves"), which he used in most of his poems is said to be a celebration of his experience in the cave temple.

Allamaprabhu spread his message with songs, playing a lyre as he wandered from place to place. Most of his compositions were spontaneous and in vernacular language, but some were written in Sandhya Bhasha (a code filled language of secret doctrines understood by Yogi Sidhas), a riddle-filled questions-packed poetry in the Vedic and Upanishadic tradition.

Allama died in Kadalivana near Srishila (Andhra Pradesh), and legend has it that he "became one with the linga".

Poems
Allamaprabhu's poetic style has been described as mystic and cryptic, rich in paradoxes and inversions (bedagu mode), staunchly against any form of symbolism, occult powers (siddhis) and their acquisition, temple worship, conventional systems and ritualistic practices, and even critical of fellow Veerashaiva devotees and poets. However, all his poems are non-sectarian and some of them even use straight forward language. About 1,300 hymns are attributed to him.

According to the Kannada scholar Shiva Prakash, Allama's poems are more akin to the Koans (riddles) in the Japanese Zen tradition, and have the effect of awakening the senses out of complacency. Critic Joseph Shipley simply categorises Allama's poems as those of a "perfect Jnani" ("saint"). Some of Allama's poems are known to question and probe the absolute rejection of the temporal by fellow Veerashaiva devotees–even Basavanna was not spared. A poem of his mocks at Akka Mahadevi for covering her nudity with tresses, while flaunting it to the world at the same time, in an act of rejection of pleasures. The scholar Basavaraju compiled 1321 extant poems of Allamaprabhu in his work Allamana Vachana Chandrike (1960). These poems are known to cover an entire range, from devotion to final union with God.

The poems give little information about Allama's early life and worldly experiences before enlightenment. In the words of the scholar Ramanujan, to a saint like Allama, "the butterfly has no memory of the caterpillar". His wisdom is reflected in his poems–only a small portion of which are on the devotee aspect (bhakta, poems 64–112). More than half of the poems dwell on the later phase (sthala) in the life of a saint, most are about union with god and of realization (aikya, poems 606–1321). His poems use the phrase "Lord of the caves" or "Guheswara" to refer to Shiva, and this practice states Subramanian is because Allamaprabhu received his enlightenment in a cave temple.

Worldview

Virasaiva and the vachanakaras
Allama was devoted to the worship of Shiva. He used his vachanas to spread Lingayathism, which is monotheistic and nondualistic, and has a strong egalitarian message. Its philosophy and practice is presented in the Panchacaras, five codes of conduct, and the Shatsthala, six phases or steps toward unity with Shiva. For the vacanakaras (Vachana poets), "first-hand 'seeing' was more important to their poetry than theological formulations." Nevertheless, the Shatsthala system provides a narrative structure to the vachanas, portraying a progress toward the union with Shiva. Later anthologies, with the notable exception of the Shoonya Sampadane, followed this scheme in their arrangement of the vachanas.

Although Allamaprabhu and the Vacanas have been qualified as bhakti poets, D.R. Nagaraj notes that Allamaprabhu was not a bhakti poet. Nagaraj explains that Allama's "insistence on opaque and mysterious modes of metaphor is in stark contrast with the emotionally transparent model of bhakti."

Social concerns
Allamaprabhu used poetry, now part of Vachana Sahitya literature, to criticise rituals and social conventions, to breakdown social barriers and to emphasize moral values and devotional worship of Shiva. The vacanakaras, of which Allama was a prominent spokesman, rejected both the 'great' traditions of Vedic religion and the 'little' local traditions, and questioned and ridiculed "classical belief systems, social customs and superstitions, image worship, the caste system, the Vedic ritual of yajna, as well as local sacrifices of lambs and goats."

During the fifteenth century Virashaiva priests consolidated the Virashaiva lore, over-emphasizing the theological and meta-physical aspects, and ignoring the socio-political aspects. The Shoonya Sampadane is a result of this consolidation, which is "a far cry from the socio-political pre-occupations of the twelfth-century movement."

Philosophy and religiosity
Allamaprabhu propagated the unitary consciousness of Self and Shiva, using poetry to express this unity. The vachanakaras regarded language as a limited means to express "the unitive experience of truth." Yet, the vachanas are seen as an expression of the Divine when, in Allama's words,

Allama's poetry and spirituality is "intensely personal and experimental," and the vachanas in general "bear [...] a highly complex relationship to other schools," which makes it very difficult to trace and establish exact influences and independent developments. Nevertheless, Allama's philosophy is described as monism and also as non-dualism ("advaita"). He de-emphasized the need to perfect difficult feats of Yoga and emphasized overcoming the boundaries between relative and absolute knowledge, between devotee and guru (teacher). He used his poetry to teach others, voicing a spirituality that is Nirguna (without attributes, qualities), yet uses Saguna devotionalism in order to metaphorically express what is inexpressible:

Writings on Allamaprabhu
Allamaprabhu was the protagonist of some important writings in the Kannada language. The Vijayanagara poet, Chamarasa, wrote Prabhulingalile (1430) in the court of King Deva Raya II, giving an account of the life and teachings of Allamaprabhu. In this work, Allama is considered an incarnation of the Hindu god Ganapati, and Parvati, the consort of the god Shiva, takes the form of the princess of Banavasi to test his detachment from the material world. So popular was the work, that the king had it translated into Tamil and Telugu languages. Later, translations were made into Sanskrit and Marathi languages.

With the intent of re-kindling the spirit of the 12th century, the Sunyasampadane ("Achievement of nothingness" or "The mystical zero"), a famous anthology of Vachana poems and Veerashaiva philosophy was compiled during the Vijayanagara era. It was compiled in four versions starting with the anthologist Shivaganaprasadi Mahadevaiah in c. 1400. Other versions by Halage Arya (1500), Siddhalingayati (1560) and Siddaveerannodaya (1570) are considered refinements. With Allama as its central figure, these anthologies give a vivid account of his interaction, in the form of dialogues, with contemporary saints and devotees. The quality of the work is considered very high.
One of his work was translated in to Tamil by Karpanai Kalangiyam Sivaprakasa Swamigal as "Prabhu Linga Leelai".

Notes

References

Sources

Print sources

Web-sources

Further reading

External links
Introducing Vacanas: Some poems of Allamaprabhu and other Virasaiva saints, MD Shirley
Lingayats as a Sect, William McCormack (1963), The Journal of the Royal Anthropological Institute of Great Britain and Ireland, Vol. 93, No. 1, pages 59–71
Work as Worship in Vīraśaiva Tradition, R Blake Michael (1982), Journal of the American Academy of Religion, Vol. 50, No. 4, pages 605-619

Lingayat poets
Lingayatism
Kannada poets
Indian social reformers
People from Shimoga district
12th-century Indian poets
Advaita Shaivism
Indian male poets
Poets from Karnataka
Lingayat saints
12th-century Indian philosophers